Ian Cumberland is an Irish visual artist. He was born in Banbridge, Co. Down, 1983. His work focuses on portraits with his paintings typically using oils as the primary media. He studied fine art at the University of Ulster.  He has won several prizes, the most significant of which was the Davy Portrait Award in 2010.
In 2019 and 2020 Cumberland deals in his work with increased commercialization, technological development and its effects on the individual. In doing so, he creates scenes that seem like a private snapshot and transport the viewer into a voyeuristic experience. He develops these by integrating his paintings into an installation consisting of audio and video works, neon light, sculptures and other plastic materials. Through this kind of deconstruction of his created sceneries he achieves a visual construction that alienates the human being within his culture, the influence of the mass media and data surveillance.

In 2011 he won third place overall in the BP Portrait Award from a field of 2400 entries.

Prizes 
 BP Portrait Award, 3rd place, 2011
 KPMG Emerging Artist Award, Royal Ulster Academy, 2010
 Davy Portrait Award, 2010
 KPMG Emerging Artist Award, Royal Ulster Academy, 2009
 Selectors Choice Award, Art Society of Ulster, 2006
 John and Rachael Turner Award, University of Ulster, 2006

Solo exhibitions  
 2020 "Presence in Absence", JD Malat Gallery, London, UK
 2019 "A Common Fiction/Once removed", Josef Filipp Gallery, Leipzig, Germany
 2018 "A Common Fiction", Golden Thread Gallery, Belfast, Northern Ireland
 2012 Albemarle Gallery, London, UK
 2008 Albemarle Gallery, London, UK

Selected group exhibitions  
 2020 "The Contemporary Human Condition", JD Malat Gallery, London, UK
 2019 "I’ll be your mirror", Josef Filipp Gallery, Leipzig, Germany
 2018 "A Brand New Darkness", Abridged, Galway Arts Centre, Ireland
 2017 "Delusional", Jonathan Levine Projects, New Jersey, USA
 2016 "Portraits of a Nation", Farmleigh Gallery, Dublin, Ireland
 2015 "BP Portrait Award" (Touring Exhibition), The National Portrait Gallery, London, Scottish National Portrait Gallery, Edinburgh, Ulster Museum, Belfast, UK
 2014 "Presently", MCAC, Portadown, Northern Ireland
 2013 "Precious Cargo", The London Street Gallery, Derry, Northern Ireland
 2012 "182nd Annual Exhibition", The Royal Hibernian Academy, Dublin, Ireland   
 2011 BP Portrait Award, The National Portrait Gallery, London
 2011 Wolverhampton Art Gallery, Wolverhampton
 2011–2012 Aberdeen Art Gallery, Aberdeen
 2010 Davy Portrait Award, Farmleigh Gallery, Dublin
 2010 Naughton Gallery, Belfast 
 2009 BP Portrait Award, The National Portrait Gallery, London
 2009 Dean Gallery of the National Galleries of Scotland, Edinburgh

External links
 Artist's website

References 

Irish portrait painters
Living people
1983 births